Alexandru Tănase (born 24 February 1971) is a Moldovan politician. He is a former president of the Constitutional Court of the Republic of Moldova. He was Justice Minister in the First Vlad Filat Cabinet, and in the first several months of the Second Filat Cabinet.

Biography 
He was a member of the Liberal Democratic Party of Moldova.

See also
Tănase v. Moldova

References

External links 
 Government of Moldova

 

1971 births
Romanian people of Moldovan descent
Constitutional court judges
Politicians from Chișinău
Living people
Moldovan jurists
Constitutional Court of Moldova judges
Moldovan Ministers of Justice
Alexandru Ioan Cuza University alumni
Liberal Democratic Party of Moldova MPs
Moldovan MPs 2009
Moldovan MPs 2009–2010
Recipients of the Order of Honour (Moldova)